Baron Conyers is a title in the Peerage of England. It was created on 17 October 1509 for William Conyers, the son-in-law of William Neville, 1st Earl of Kent. The abeyance after the death of the 3rd baron was terminated for the 7th Baron Darcy de Knayth, these baronies were held together until the abeyance of 1888, after which the abeyance of these two baronies were separately terminated. Since 1509, the Barons Conyers had held a part of the "right" to the barony Fauconberg, i.e. the part for which the abeyance was terminated in 1903; and since the termination of the abeyance of the barony Fauconberg, the two baronies, Conyers and Fauconberg, had been held together; from 1948 they were abeyant between the two daughters of the 5th Earl of Yarborough. On the death of the younger daughter in 2012 the abeyance terminated automatically in favour of her elder sister, the 15th holder of the title. Since the death of the latter in 2013, the title is in abeyance once more.

The baronies Conyers and Darcy de Knayth originated the courtesy title of the eldest son of the Earl of Holderness as Lord Darcy and Conyers.

Barons Conyers (1509)
William Conyers, 1st Baron Conyers (d. 1524)
Christopher Conyers, 2nd Baron Conyers (d. 1538)
John Conyers, 3rd Baron Conyers (d. 1557) (abeyant 1557)
Conyers Darcy, 7th Baron Darcy de Knayth and 4th Baron Conyers (1570–1654) (abeyance terminated c. 1641/44 in favour of the 3rd Baron's grandson)
Conyers Darcy, 1st Earl of Holderness, 8th Baron Darcy de Knayth and 5th Baron Conyers (d. 1689)
Conyers Darcy, 2nd Earl of Holderness, 9th Baron Darcy de Knayth and 6th Baron Conyers (c. 1620–1692)
Robert Darcy, 3rd Earl of Holderness, 10th Baron Darcy de Knayth and 7th Baron Conyers (1681–1722)
Robert Darcy, 4th Earl of Holderness, 11th Baron Darcy de Knayth and 8th Baron Conyers (1718–1778)
Amelia Osborne, 12th Baroness Darcy de Knayth and 9th Baroness Conyers (1754–1784)
George William Frederick Osborne, 6th Duke of Leeds, 13th Baron Darcy de Knayth and 10th Baron Conyers (1775–1838)
Francis Godolphin Darcy-Osborne, 7th Duke of Leeds, 14th Baron Darcy de Knayth and 11th Baron Conyers (1798–1859)
Sackville George Lane-Fox, 15th Baron Darcy de Knayth and 12th Baron Conyers (1827–1888) (abeyant 1888)
Marcia Amelia Mary Pelham, 7th Baroness Fauconberg and 13th Baroness Conyers (1863–1926) (abeyance terminated 1892)
Sackville George Pelham, 5th Earl of Yarborough, 8th Baron Fauconberg and 14th Baron Conyers (1888–1948) (abeyant 1948)
Diana Mary Miller, 11th Countess of Mértola, 9th Baroness Fauconberg, 15th Baroness Conyers (1920–2013) (abeyance terminated 2012; abeyant 2013)

The co-heiresses to the title are the two daughters of the 15th baroness, the Hon Marcia Anne Miller (born 1954) otherwise known as Anthea Theresa Lycett, and the Hon Beatrix Diana Miller (born 1955).

References

1509 establishments in England
Abeyant baronies in the Peerage of England
 
Noble titles created in 1509